Adikmet is an urban locality in Hyderabad, India. Mainly a residential area, it is very close to Osmania University's campus. The neighbourhood has a hanuman temple and is located near the road from Nallakunta to Tarnaka.

Transport 

The TSRTC buses connects Adikmet with all parts of the city. The closest MMTS Train station is at Jamia Osmania.

References 
Neighbourhoods in Hyderabad, India
https://www.deccanchronicle.com/lifestyle/books-and-art/220317/hyderabad-osmania-universitys-rare-manuscripts-revealed.html#:~:text=According%20to%20historical%20accounts%2C%20Mah,Asaf%20Jahi%20dynasty%20of%20Hyderabad.